HD 65216 is a triple star system with two exoplanetary companions in the southern constellation of Carina. With an apparent visual magnitude of 7.97 it cannot be readily seen without technical aid, but with binoculars or telescope it should be visible. The system is located at a distance of 114.7 light-years from the Sun based on parallax measurements, and is drifting further away with a radial velocity of 42.6 km/s.

The primary, component A, is an ordinary G-type main-sequence star with a stellar classification of G5V. It is nearly two billion years old and is spinning with a projected rotational velocity of 1.3 km/s. The star has 95% of the mass and 86% of the radius of the Sun. It is radiating 72% of the luminosity of the Sun from its photosphere at an effective temperature of 5,718 K.

Component B is of class M7–8 while component C is class L2–3; both have a mass close to the sub-stellar limit.

An extrasolar planet (designated as HD 65216 b) was discovered orbiting the primary in 2003. A second much more distant planet was suspected since 2013, but was discovered on a completely different orbit in 2019.

See also
 List of extrasolar planets

References

External links
 

G-type main-sequence stars
M-type main-sequence stars
Triple stars
Planetary systems with two confirmed planets

Carina (constellation)
Durchmusterung objects
065216
038558